Clan Macalister was a steam ship built in 1903 by the Archibald McMillan & Son of Dumbarton. She was the second ship named Clan Macalister in service with the Clan Line used on their Oriental routes.

Design and Construction
In 1902 Clan Line sold their old steamer Clan Macalister, and placed an order with Archibald McMillan & Son of Dumbarton to build a new ship for them. The ship was launched on 18 March 1903 and after sea trials was commissioned in April of the same year.

Operational history
In early 1900s, the Clan Line operated two main routes between United Kingdom and her colonies in the East. The first one was a direct route from the home ports through the Strait of Gibraltar, Suez Canal and to the ports of India and Ceylon. The second one involved sailing down the western coast of Africa first to the ports of South African colonies, then onto the ports of Ceylon and India, and occasional trips to Australia.

Clan Macalister departed for her maiden voyage from Barrow on 3 May 1903 for South Africa.

Sinking

On 6 November 1915 Clan Macalister, while on a passage from Liverpool to Calcutta with general cargo, was captured by the German submarine , in an approximate position , about 120 miles southeast off Cape Martello, Crete, and was subsequently sunk with a torpedo.

Notes 

1903 ships
Steamships of the United Kingdom
Merchant ships of the United Kingdom
Maritime incidents in 1915
Ships of the Clan Line
World War I shipwrecks in the Mediterranean Sea
Ships sunk by German submarines in World War I